Mortal Coil: Adrenalin Intelligence is a first-person shooter developed by Crush and released in 1995 by Virgin Interactive Entertainment.
The game featured a tactical element where the player would control four different characters and plan their movement either by moving them in real-time, or through a planning perspective similar to Rainbow Six.

External links

1995 video games
DOS games
DOS-only games
First-person shooters
Tactical shooter video games
Video games developed in the United Kingdom
Video games with pre-rendered 3D graphics
Sprite-based first-person shooters
Video games with 2.5D graphics